In religion, a blessing (also used to refer to bestowing of such) is the impartation of something with grace, holiness, spiritual redemption, or divine will.

Etymology and Germanic paganism 
The modern English language term bless likely derives from the 1225 term , which developed from the Old English  (preserved in the Northumbrian dialect around 950 AD). Due to this, the term is related to the term , meaning 'blood'. References to this indigenous practice, Blót, exist in related Icelandic sources.

The modern meaning of the term may have been influenced in translations of the Bible into Old English during the process of Christianization to translate the Latin term  meaning 'to speak well of', resulting in meanings such as 'to praise' or 'extol' or 'to speak of' or 'to wish well'.

Abrahamic religions

'To be blessed' means to be favored by God, the source of all blessing. Blessings, therefore, are directly associated with, and are believed to come from, God. Thus, to express a blessing is like bestowing a wish on someone that they experience the favor of God, and to acknowledge God as the source of all blessing.

A biblical damnation, in its most formal sense, is a negative blessing.

In the Bible, positive and negative blessings are related; the book of Deuteronomy prescribes that obedience to the Law of Moses brings God's blessing. One of the first incidences of blessing in the Bible is in Genesis,  where Abram is ordered by the God to leave his country and is told:

The Priestly Blessing is set forth at Numbers :

 May Adonai bless you, and guard you;
 May Adonai make His countenance shine upon you, and be gracious to you;
 May Adonai turn His countenance to you and grant you peace.

Judaism

In Rabbinic Judaism, a blessing (or berakhah) is recited at a specified moment during a prayer, ceremony or other activity, especially before and after partaking of food. The function of blessings is to acknowledge God as the source of all blessing. A berakhah of rabbinic origin typically starts with the words, "Blessed are You, Lord our God, King of the universe..." Rabbinic Judaism teaches that food ultimately is a gift of the one great Provider, God, and that to partake of food legitimately one should express gratitude to God by reciting the appropriate blessing of rabbinic origin prior, while torah mandates an informal blessing afterwards. Jewish law does not reserve recitation of blessings to only a specific class of Jews; but it does mandate specific blessings to specific occasions, so that, for example since medieval times, Jewish women chiefly recite a rabbinic blessing after lighting two Shabbat candles.

Christianity

Blessings and curses of Christ appear in the New Testament, as recounted in the Beatitudes of Luke 6:20-22. Within Roman Catholicism, Eastern Orthodoxy, Anglicanism, Lutheranism, and similar traditions, formal blessings of the church are performed by bishops, priests, and deacons. Particular formulas may be associated with episcopal blessings and papal blessings. In Roman Catholic, Eastern Orthodox, Anglican, and Lutheran churches blessings are bestowed by bishops and priests in a liturgical context, raising their right hand and making the sign of the cross with it over persons or objects to be blessed. They also give blessings to begin divine services and at the dismissal at the end.

In the Eastern Orthodox Church liturgical blessings are performed over people, objects, or are given at specific points during divine services. A priest or bishop usually blesses with his hand, but may use a blessing cross, candles, an icon, the Chalice or Gospel Book to bestow blessings, always making the Sign of the Cross therewith. When blessing with the hand, a priest uses his right hand, holding his fingers so that they form the Greek letters IC XC, the monogram of Jesus Christ. A bishop does the same, except he uses both hands, or may hold the crozier in his left hand, using both to make the Sign of the Cross. A bishop may also bless with special candlesticks known as the dikirion and trikirion. When blessing an object, the rubrics often instruct Orthodox bishops and priests to make use of such substances as incense and holy water. Also, formal ecclesiastical permission to undertake an action is referred to as a "blessing". The blessing may be bestowed by a bishop or priest, or by one's own spiritual father. When an Orthodox layperson bestows a blessing, he or she will hold the thumb and first two fingers of the right hand together (the same configuration used when making the Sign of the Cross on themselves), and make the sign of the cross over the person or object they are blessing.

In Protestant liturgies such as those of Presbyterian, Baptist, Methodist, or Reformed churches, the minister blesses the congregation during the concluding part of the service of worship, known as the benediction. For example, the Orthodox Presbyterian Directory for Public Worship states that "Unless necessary, none should depart until after the benediction," and "by his Spirit working through the ministry of the Word, God addresses his people in the call to worship, in the salutation and benediction, in the reading and preaching of the Word, and in the 
sacraments." The Methodist The Book of Worship for Church and Home (1965) contains "An Office for the Blessing of a Dwelling".

In the Roman Catholic Church a priest or bishop blesses the faithful with the Blessed Sacrament in the monstrance during Benediction of the Blessed Sacrament. According to the guidelines given by the Vatican's Congregation for the Discipline of the Sacraments that govern the procedures for liturgical ceremonies, if a Roman Catholic layperson (a lay acolyte or parish administrator, for example) or any non-ordained religious (who is not the superior of the congregation) leads a Sunday service (other than a Mass, which requires a priest to celebrate), such as Eucharistic adoration, the Rosary, or celebration of the Liturgy of the Hours, he or she does not perform rites or sacraments reserved to the clergy and does not solemnly bless the people as a bishop, priest, or deacon would at the end of the service; an alternative format is used instead.

In the Lutheran Churches, priests are often asked to bless objects frequently used by or sacred to individuals, such as a cross necklace; in addition, Lutheran clergy also bless the homes of members of the congregations.

In the Church of Jesus Christ of Latter-day Saints, blessings are given by worthy, male members who hold the Melchizedek priesthood.

Islam

Blessings in Islam have two aspects, according to major scholars of Islam. Blessings are given by Allah as a trial for mankind. Scholars of Islam believe that having fear of being gradually misled by blessings is an attribute of the pious, and not having fear from such even though one is constantly misbehaving is an attribute of the impious. Blessings can be a source of success in the afterlife if one is grateful to Allah for them and the same blessings can be a source for damnation in afterlife if a person is not constantly grateful to God for them.

Islam has no clerical caste, and therefore no blessings reserved to specific individuals. Muslims will frequently pronounce "peace and blessings be upon him" when mentioning the name of Muhammad or indeed, any of the prophets. Muslims will also greet one another with a blessing every time they meet and depart:   (meaning "may peace, mercy and blessings of God be upon you").

Dharma religions
Indian religions, which includes Hinduism and other religions like Buddhism, Jainism, Sikhism, etc. are also called Dharmic religions, all of which are based on the different concept of dharma and karma and typical blessings are based on Adhiṣṭhāna, Añjali Mudrā, Darśana and Mudra, etc.

Hinduism

In Hinduism Puja is a religious ritual performed by Hindus as an offering to various deities, distinguished persons, or special guests. It is modeled on the idea of giving a gift or offering to a deity or important person and receiving their approval. During the Puja involves an 'Aarti plate' or 'Aarti lamp' is circulating around a deity or person and is generally accompanied by the singing of songs in praise of that deity or person (many versions exist). In doing so, the plate or lamp is supposed to acquire the power of the deity. The priest circulates the plate or lamp to all those present. They cup their down-turned hands over the flame and then raise their palms to their forehead – the purificatory blessing, passed from the deity's image to the flame, has now been passed to the devotee.

During the naivedya ritual, a devotee makes an offering of a material substance such as flowers, fruits, or sweets. The deity then 'enjoys' or tastes a bit of the offering, which is then temporarily known as bhogya. This now-divinely invested substance is called prasāda, and is received by the devotee to be ingested, worn, etc. It may be the same material that was originally offered, or material offered by others and then re-distributed to other devotees. In many temples, several kinds of prasada (e.g. nuts, sweets) are distributed to the devotees.

Darshan is a term meaning 'sight' (in the sense of an instance of seeing or beholding; from a root  'to see'), vision, apparition, or glimpse. It is most commonly used for "visions of the divine," e.g., of a god or a very holy person or artifact. One could "receive " of the deity in the temple, or from a great saintly person, such as a great guru. Children touch the feet of their family elders while people of all ages will bend to touch the feet of a great guru, murti (icon) of a Deva (God) (such as Rama or Krishna).

There is a special link between worshipper and guru during pujas, in which people may touch the guru's feet in respect (Pranāma), or remove the dust from a guru's feet before touching their own head.

This is a ritual that is performed when one purchases a new vehicle.

Buddhism

In Mangala Sutta, Lord Buddha describes 'blessings' that are wholesome personal pursuits or attainments, identified in a progressive manner from the mundane to the ultimate spiritual goal.

Blessings in Buddhism, certain ceremonies are meant to provide blessings.

Other uses

Blessing is also a term used for marriage in the Unification Church, see: Blessing Ceremony of the Unification Church.

Clergy will normally receive a blessing from their ecclesiastical superiors to begin their ministry. In the Russian Orthodox Church pious laymen would go to a starets (elder) to receive his or her blessing before embarking upon any important work or making a major decision in their life. In the Church of Jesus Christ of Latter-day Saints, a member may receive a special blessing, known as a patriarchal blessing, as guidance.

In the U.S., there are sometimes ritual ceremonies to bless companion animals.

In Hawaii anything new (a new building, a new stretch of road to be opened, a new garden) receives a blessing by a Hawaiian practitioner (or Kahuna) in a public ceremony (involving also the unwinding of e.g. a maile lei).

In Spanish, there is a blessing which can be used as a tender farewell, especially from a parent:  ('Go with God'), also Adiós ('to God'), similar to the French .

The procedure might be from the pre-Islamic local nomadic traditions with deep family values. Sometimes, older  might give a negative blessing (so-called  – 'the opposite blessing' or 'the black blessing').

In commercial interactions, a seller's good words about the product, such as "I hope you enjoy it," could be considered to be blessings.

See also
 Apostolic Blessing
 Benediction
 Blessing of animals
 Darśana
 List of Jewish Prayers and Blessings
 Priesthood blessing

References

 Barnhart, Robert K. (1995) The Barnhart Concise Dictionary of Etymology HarperCollins

External links

Religious rituals
Spiritual warfare
Christian worship and liturgy